Dorothea Augusta of Schleswig-Holstein-Gottorp (12 May 1602 – 13 March 1682) was a German noblewoman from the House of (Schleswig-)Holstein-Gottorp, a cadet branch of the House of Oldenburg. She became the first Duchess of Schleswig-Holstein-Sonderburg-Plön as the wife of Duke Joachim Ernest (1595–1671).

Life 

Dorothea Augusta was born on 12 May 1602 as the fourth child and second daughter of John Adolf, Duke of Holstein-Gottorp and his wife, Princess Augusta of Denmark. She had seven siblings, including three sisters, six of whom survived infancy.

In 1633, she married Joachim Ernest, Duke of Schleswig-Holstein-Sonderburg-Plön. On the occasion of their marriage, Joachim Ernest built a new residence and seat of government, Plön Castle, in the seat of his duchy, the town of Plön, which was completed in 1636. The couple ruled over only a small territory, as Joachim Ernest and his four brothers had divided the duchy of their father among themselves, resulting in five small ones. Their estate included Plön, Ahrensbök and Reinfeld.

Issue 
Dorothea Augusta had eight children with his husband, seven of whom survived childhood:
 Duke John Adolphus of Schleswig-Holstein-Sonderburg-Plön (8 April 1634 – 2 July 1704), who became Duke of Schleswig-Holstein-Sonderburg-Plön, married Dorothea of Brunswick-Wolfenbüttel and had issue
 Duke Augustus of Schleswig-Holstein-Sonderburg-Plön (9 May 1635 – 17 September 1699), who became Duke of Schleswig-Holstein-Sonderburg-Plön-Norburg, married Princess Elisabeth Charlotte of Anhalt-Harzgerode (1647–1723) and had issue
 Duchess Ernestine of Schleswig-Holstein-Sonderburg-Plön (10 October 1636 – 18 March 1696)
 Duke Joachim Ernest II of Schleswig-Holstein-Sonderburg-Plön (5 October 1637 – 5 October 1700), who became Duke of Schleswig-Holstein-Sonderburg-Plön-Rethwisch, who married Isabella of Merode-Westerloo (c. 1649 – 5 January 1701)
 Duke Bernard of Schleswig-Holstein-Sonderburg-Plön (31 January 1639 – 13 January 1676), Danish general
 Duchess Agnes Hedwig of Schleswig-Holstein-Sonderburg-Plön (29 September 1640 – 20 November 1698), who married Christian, Duke of Schleswig-Holstein-Sonderburg-Glücksburg and had issue
 Duke Charles Henry of Schleswig-Holstein-Sonderburg-Plön  (20 March 1642 – 20 January 1655), who died at the age of 13
 Duchess Sophia Eleonora of Schleswig-Holstein-Sonderburg-Plön (30 July 1644 – 22 January 1689), who married Wolfgang Julius, Count of Hohenlohe-Neuenstein and had no issue

Ancestry

References 

1602 births
1682 deaths
German duchesses
Daughters of monarchs